Jph Wacheski (or Jeph) is a musician and independent video game developer in Ottawa, Ontario, Canada.

Games

Wacheski's games and music are experimental in design. The games are typically in a retro arcade style with unique modern sound design. His game releases bear the name of his studio, Iteration Games.

LockOn and Valence have both received the "Top Dog" award at Home of the Underdogs, and several of Wacheski's games have been featured on the Independent Gaming Web log. His games are included in many collections of free and independent games, both on the Web and on CD-ROMs packaged with magazines.

Releases
LockOn (2003)
Joust 3: Revenge of the Lava Troll (2003)
Seeds: Three Birds of the Apocalypse (2003)
Wizard of Wor (remake) (2003)
Electric Yo-Yo (remake) (2003)
Valence (2004)
Sub Atomic (2004)
Lunar Rescue (2005)
Quiescence (2005)
100 Invaders (2006)
Cathode Raygun (2006)
Forward (2006)
Upstream (2006)

Music

Wacheski's music recordings and live shows have been under the names And the Earth Died Screaming, Zug Island, and Jph Wacheski.

He has performed his music live at various live shows mostly in and around Toronto, including A Month of Sundays (2001), Aspect (2002), and The Ambient Ping (together with Leif Bloomquist as Jamming Signal, 2003).

References

External links
 Iteration Games, Wacheski's site
 GameSetWatch column featuring Wacheski's games
 Interview with Jph Wacheski

Canadian video game designers
Living people
Musicians from Ottawa
Year of birth missing (living people)